Dick Peter Last (born 3 February 1969) is a Swedish former footballer who played as a goalkeeper. Last most notably represented IK Oddevold, IFK Göteborg, IFK Norrköping, and Örgryte IS and was named the Swedish Goalkeeper of the Year in 1996.

He won one cap for the Sweden national team.

Club career

Last started his career at Munkedals IF before joining IK Oddevold in 1986. In 1987, he left for big club IFK Göteborg and two years later returned to Uddevalla and IK Oddevold. In 1991, after gaining some first team experience, he again left IK Oddevold for IFK Göteborg.

After five years as backup for legendary Swedish goalkeeper Thomas Ravelli at IFK Göteborg, Last left for Allsvenskan rivals IFK Norrköping in 1996. That year he was awarded the "Swedish goalkeeper of the year award", beating Ravelli who had won the award the previous year.

When Thomas Ravelli in 1998 left IFK Göteborg to play for Major League Soccer team Tampa Bay Mutiny, Dick Last again joined IFK Göteborg.

Once again finding himself being the "second" choice at IFK Göteborg, in 1999 Last left for Danish club Vejle BK. In 2000, he came back to Gothenburg and Allsvenskan when he signed for Örgryte IS.

Last ended his playing career in 2008 at Örgryte IS to become sports director at the same club. In the fall of 2010 Last had to leave due to the club's financial difficulties.

Comeback
In 2011, at the age of 42, Dick Last announced his comeback to football. He signed for Division 1 Södra club IK Oddevold, who he also played for in the late 80's, as a backup goalkeeper.

International career

In October 2002, Dick made his debut for the Swedish national team, coming on as substitute in a friendly game against Portugal at Ullevi. This was his first and only cap for Sweden.

Honours
 Swedish Goalkeeper of the Year: 1996

Club statistics

References

External links
 
 Profile at Fotbollstransfers.com 

Living people
1969 births
Swedish footballers
Sweden international footballers
Association football goalkeepers
IK Oddevold players
IFK Norrköping players
Örgryte IS players
IFK Göteborg players
Vejle Boldklub players
Allsvenskan players
Superettan players
Ettan Fotboll players
Division 3 (Swedish football) players
Danish Superliga players
Swedish expatriate footballers
Expatriate men's footballers in Denmark
People from Munkedal Municipality
Sportspeople from Västra Götaland County